Gangadhar Gade is an Indian politician and Ambedkarite sociopolitical activist. He is the former leader of the Republican Party of India, and is president of the Panther Republic Party. He is former minister of Maharashtra. He is a popular Buddhist leader. Gade was the leader of the Namantar Andolan (Name Change Movement) of Marathwada University. On 7 July  1977, Dalit Panthers general secretary Gangadhar Gade firstly demanded that the name of Dr. Babasaheb Ambedkar be given to Marathwada University.

References

Republican Party of India politicians
Living people
Marathi politicians
Maharashtra politicians
Indian Buddhists
Social workers
Social workers from Maharashtra
Dalit activists
Activists from Maharashtra
20th-century Indian politicians
21st-century Indian politicians
Year of birth missing (living people)
People from Aurangabad, Maharashtra